Court is a surname. Notable people with the surname include:

Alyson Court (born 1973), Canadian actress
Antoine Court (1696-1760), French Huguenot Protestant reformer
Arthur Bertram Court (1927-2012), Australian botanist
Charles Court (1911-2007), Premier of Western Australia and Margaret Court's father-in-law
Claude Auguste Court (1793-1880), French soldier and mercenary, general to Maharaja Ranjit Sinjh
David Court (footballer) (born 1944), English footballer and coach
David Court (bishop) (born 1958), British Anglican bishop
David Court (cricketer) (born 1980), English cricketer
Hazel Court (1926-2008), English actress
Margaret Court (born 1942), Australian retired tennis player
Robert Courts (born 1978), a British politician
William Court (1842–1910), Australian born cricketer